Thomas Edward Davis or Davies ( or 1795 – March 16, 1878) was a prolific real estate developer who built residential properties in New York between 1830 and 1860.

Early life
Davis emigrated from England to New Brunswick, New Jersey, early in the 19th century, with the intention of setting up a whiskey distilling business. When the distillery failed, he moved to New York City in 1830.

Property development

Manhattan
Davis began his career in property speculation in New York with financial backing from the banking house of J.L. & S. Joseph & Co. The Joseph were a major firm of securities brokers and had the agency for the Rothschilds but became overextended and was a casualty of the crash of 1837.

In 1831, Davis built Federal style townhouses in red brick on both sides of East 8th Street, between Third & Second Avenues, developing the entire block known as St. Mark's Place. The townhouses originally stood "virtually alone in the meadows and marshland of the Stuyvesant family's farm", heightening "the grandeur of these two rows". There remain three surviving townhouses from this development: the Hamilton-Holly House at 4 St. Mark's Place, the building at 25 St. Mark's Place, and the best preserved of the three, the Daniel LeRoy House at 20 St. Mark's Place.

Further developments by Davis in the area include Carroll Place, on the block from Thompson Place to LaGuardia Place.

Toward the end of the recession that followed the Panic of 1837, which lasted until the mid-1840s, Davis was able to purchase 400 plots on Fifth Avenue (north of Twentieth Street) for a few hundred dollars each and built a complete block of fine dwellings between East 31st and East 32nd Street.

Staten Island
Between 1834 and 1835, Davis bought land on Staten Island that ran from the quarantine station to Sailors' Snug Harbor, or nearly the whole of northern Staten Island. He called the area New Brighton (after a coastal resort in England), and built Greek revival style houses on the shoreline. An association of wealthy entrepreneurs was set up to further develop the land and promote the area as a suburb, with easy access to New York via steam ferries.  However, almost immediately, the financial crisis known as the Panic of 1837 resulted in foreclosure of the association.

Davis, with co-partners, re-acquired the development and managed to ride out the recession.  Davis lost a substantial amount of money during this period but survived the crash, while the bankers who had initially provided support for Davis, J.L. & S. Joseph, failed.

Minnesota
Davis and two of his sons-in-law, Frederick C. Gebhard and John F. A. Sanford, became involved with financing the St. Anthony Falls Water Power Company in Minneapolis. Sanford, who had been a frontiersman, was acquainted with the men developing the project and they invited him to invest.  He in turn brought in Davis and Gebhard.  The relationship between the developers and the New York backers was not good, and finally broke down following the death of Sanford in 1857.  Gebhard died in 1865, his brother William H. Gebhard became involved, court action followed, and it took several years for the situation to be finally resolved.

Later life
Davis became extremely wealthy, and was considered the greatest real estate speculator of his time. Among New York City real estate owners, Davis's holdings were placed third after John Jacob Astor and department store mogul Alexander Turney Stewart. In the mid 1860s, Davis moved with his family to Italy.

Personal life
Davis's wife was Anne Power, who had been born in Ireland in October 1799. Her brother was John Power, Vicar General of New York and pastor of St. Peter's on Barclay Street in Lower Manhattan.  Another brother was Irish politician Maurice Power, who married the daughter of Judge Henry Brockholst Livingston.  Together, Thomas and Anne Davis had eight children who survived to adulthood, one son and seven daughters:

 Thomas Edward Davis Jr. (d. 1916), who married Marianita Jove (d. 1870), daughter of Lorenzo Jove.  Davis Jr. was a friend of the Irish writer and poet Fitz James O'Brien, and was involved in trying to raise a regiment with him during the American Civil War, called the McClellan Rifles.  When O'Brien was killed, Davis Jr. brought his remains back from Baltimore for burial in New York and acted as one of his executors. Davis Jr. was in poor health and eventually moved to Europe where he died in Bournemouth, England, in 1916.  His daughter, Marianita, remained his companion until his death.
 Catherine "Kate" Davis (1829−1870), who married Frederick Charles Gebhard (1825−1865). Of the Davis children, they were the only couple to remain in the United States.
 Isabel Davis (1832−1898), who married John Francis Alexander Sanford (1806–1857), a widower twenty-five years older than herself. She moved to Paris after his death.
 Anna Davis (–1925), who married Auguste La Montagne (−1894).
 Mathilde "Tilly" Davis (1841−1917), who married Don Antonio Lante Montefeltro della Rovere (1831−1897)
 Eliza "Lizzie" Davis (b. ), who married Marquis Angelo Gavotti Verospi (1835−1916)
 Nora Davis (1846−1913), who married Charles Joseph Blanc de Lanautte, comte d'Hautverie (b. 1848)
 Marie Davis (1850−1932), who married Anatole Eugène Alexis Taffin d'Heursel (b. 1844); she left him for Henry Louis Eugène Marie Say (1850–1899) of the French sugar manufacturing family in about 1878.  Unable to obtain a divorce, she took Swiss naturalization and married Say on May 20, 1882 in Switzerland.  After his death in 1899, his will was contested by his sister, Jeanne-Marie Say, Vicomtesse de Trédern, on the grounds of his children's legitimization.
	
He died in Florence on March 16, 1878, at the age of 93. His body was returned to America, where he was buried at Saint Patrick's Old Cathedral Churchyard in Manhattan.

Notes

References

18th-century births
1878 deaths
American real estate businesspeople
Real estate and property developers
19th-century American businesspeople
British emigrants to the United States